List of the National Register of Historic Places listings in Manhattan above 110th Street

This is intended to be a complete list of properties and districts listed on the National Register of Historic Places above 110th Street in the New York City borough of Manhattan, with the borough being coterminous with New York County, New York. This includes listings on Manhattan Island as well as the neighborhood of Marble Hill, which is on the North American mainland and across the Harlem River from Manhattan Island. For properties and districts in other parts of Manhattan and the other islands of New York County, see National Register of Historic Places listings in Manhattan. The locations of National Register properties and districts (at least for all showing latitude and longitude coordinates below) may be seen in an online map by clicking on "Map of all coordinates".



Listings above 110th Street

|}

Former listing

|}

See also

County: National Register of Historic Places listings in New York County, New York
State: National Register of Historic Places listings in New York
Municipal: List of New York City Designated Landmarks in Manhattan above 110th Street

References

Above 110